Robot Warriors is a role-playing game published by Hero Games in 1986.

Description
Robot Warriors is a system of science-fiction giant-robot rules, based on the Hero System. The rulebook covers robot construction and battle rules, robot-pilot (i.e., human) character creation, combat, and skills. The game includes guidelines for campaigns, how the technology works, sample robots and characters, and an introductory scenario.

Publication history
Robot Warriors was designed by Steve Perrin and George MacDonald, with illustrations by Jim Holloway, and was published in 1986 by Hero Games and Iron Crown Enterprises as a 160-page book.

Robot Warriors, by Steve Perrin, was the sixth RPG by Hero Games.

References

Hero System
Mecha role-playing games
Role-playing games introduced in 1986
Science fiction role-playing games